Colonel (Rtd.) Emmanuel M. Osei-Wusu is a former Ghanaian politician and military commander. He was Minister of the Interior from 1992–1996 in the Rawlings government.

Military appointments 

Officer commanding forces movement control, 2nd Infantry Battalion, 162

Staff captain movement, Ministry of Defense, June 1962-1963

Staff officer Quartermaster General, June 1963-1965

Assistant Adjutant Quartermaster General (movement) December 1965-April 1966

Commanding Officer 6th Infantry Battalion, April-November 1968

Commanding Officer 3rd Infantry Battalion, November-December 1968

Commanding Officer 4th Infantry Battalion, August 1970-June 1971

Brigade Commander, 2nd Infantry Brigade Group (Central Command), June 1971-August 1972

After he and other NDC politicians were accused of corruption by NPP opponents, and investigated by the CHRAJ, he stepped aside from politics.

He retired to his hometown of Pepease, Kwahu, where he lived a solitary life. Colonel (Rtd) Osei Wusu died in 2016.

References

Year of birth missing (living people)
Living people
Ghanaian soldiers
Interior ministers of Ghana
National Democratic Congress (Ghana) politicians